Yawger Creek is a river located in Cayuga County, New York. It flows into Cayuga Lake south of Cayuga, New York.

References

Rivers of Cayuga County, New York
Rivers of New York (state)